Abdullah Mussa (born 20 February 1961) is a Libyan weightlifter. He competed in the men's middle heavyweight event at the 1988 Summer Olympics.

References

1961 births
Living people
Libyan male weightlifters
Olympic weightlifters of Libya
Weightlifters at the 1988 Summer Olympics
Place of birth missing (living people)